Liliya Lobanova, née Pilyuhina (born 14 October 1985) is a Ukrainian athlete who specializes in the 400 metres and 800 metres.

She was born in Luhansk. She finished eighth in the 400 metres at the 2004 World Junior Championships, fourth in the 4 x 400 metres relay at the 2005 European Indoor Championships, and fifth in the relay at the 2005 World Championships. At the 2005 Summer Universiade she won a bronze medal in the relay.

Her personal best times are 51.85 seconds in the 400 metres, achieved in June 2005 in Minsk; and 2:01.33 minutes in the 800 metres, achieved in June 2009 in Yalta.

References

1985 births
Living people
Sportspeople from Luhansk
Ukrainian female sprinters
Ukrainian female middle-distance runners
Universiade medalists in athletics (track and field)
Universiade bronze medalists for Ukraine
Medalists at the 2005 Summer Universiade
Medalists at the 2011 Summer Universiade
20th-century Ukrainian women
21st-century Ukrainian women